Ford City may refer to:

Canada
Ford City, Ontario

United States
Ford City, California
Ford City, Missouri
Ford City, Pennsylvania
West Lawn, Chicago#Ford City
Ford City Mall